Coolbaugh may refer to:

 Coolbaugh Township, Monroe County, Pennsylvania 
 USS Coolbaugh (DE-217), a Buckley-class destroyer escort of the United States Navy

People
Coolbaugh (surname)

See also
 Mike Coolbaugh Award, Minor League Baseball award